This article provides information on candidates who stood for the 1940 Australian federal election. The election was held on 21 September 1940.

Earlier in 1940, the Lang Labor supporters had again broken away from the federal Australian Labor Party. Seats held by the defectors are designated as Labor seats.

By-elections, appointments and defections

By-elections and appointments
On 12 July 1938, Jim Sheehan (Labor) was appointed a Victorian Senator to replace John Barnes (Labor).
On 10 December 1938, Sydney McHugh (Labor) was elected to succeed Charles Hawker (UAP) as the member for Wakefield.
On 20 May 1939, William Conelan (Labor) was elected to succeed Frank Baker (Labor) as the member for Griffith.
On 27 May 1939, Lancelot Spurr (Labor) was elected to succeed Joseph Lyons (UAP) as the member for Wilmot.
On 2 March 1940, John Dedman (Labor) was elected to succeed Richard Casey (UAP) as the member for Corio.
On 13 August 1940, three UAP cabinet ministers, Geoffrey Street (Corangamite), James Fairbairn (Flinders) and Sir Henry Gullett (Henty), were killed in the Canberra air disaster. No by-elections were held due to the proximity of the election.

Defections
In 1937, Country Party MP John McEwen (Indi) was expelled from the state-based party for accepting a ministry in the Lyons-Page government. In response, following the party conference in 1938, Thomas Paterson (Gippsland) led over a hundred McEwen supporters out of the state United Country Party to form the breakaway Liberal Country Party, loyal to the Page-led federal party. The Country Party's other Victorian MP, George Rankin (Bendigo), remained with the UCP.
In 1938, Independent UAP MP Percy Spender (Warringah) joined the United Australia Party.
In 1940, supporters of New South Wales Premier Jack Lang again broke away from the federal Labor Party, this time calling themselves the Australian Labor Party (Non-Communist). Its federal members were Senator Stan Amour (New South Wales), Senator John Armstrong (New South Wales), Jack Beasley (West Sydney), Joe Gander (Reid), Dan Mulcahy (Lang), Sol Rosevear (Dalley) and Tom Sheehan (Cook).

Retiring Members and Senators

Labor
 William Maloney MP (Melbourne, Vic)

United Australia
Senator Charles Grant (Tas)

Country
 James Hunter MP (Maranoa, Qld)

House of Representatives
Sitting members at the time of the election are shown in bold text. Successful candidates are highlighted in the relevant colour. Where there is possible confusion, an asterisk (*) is also used.

New South Wales

Northern Territory

Queensland

South Australia

Tasmania

Victoria

Western Australia

Senate
Sitting Senators are shown in bold text. Tickets that elected at least one Senator are highlighted in the relevant colour. Successful candidates are identified by an asterisk (*).

New South Wales
Three seats were up for election. The United Australia Party-Country Party Coalition was defending two seats. The Labor Party was defending one seat. Labor Senators Stan Amour, John Armstrong and Tom Arthur were not up for re-election.

Queensland
Three seats were up for election. The United Australia Party-Country Party Coalition was defending three seats. Labor Senators Gordon Brown, Joe Collings and Ben Courtice were not up for re-election.

South Australia
Three seats were up for election. The United Australia Party was defending three seats. United Australia Party Senators Philip McBride, Alexander McLachlan and Keith Wilson were not up for re-election.

Tasmania
Three seats were up for election. The United Australia Party was defending three seats. Labor Senators Bill Aylett, Richard Darcey and Charles Lamp were not up for re-election.

Victoria
Four seats were up for election. One of these was a short-term vacancy caused by Labor Senator-elect John Barnes's death; this had been filled in the interim by Labor's Jim Sheehan. The United Australia Party-Country Party Coalition was defending three seats. The Labor Party was defending one seat. Labor Senators Don Cameron and Richard Keane were not up for re-election.

Western Australia
Three seats were up for election. The United Australia Party-Country Party Coalition was defending three seats. Labor Senators Robert Clothier, James Cunningham and James Fraser were not up for re-election.

See also
 1940 Australian federal election
 Members of the Australian House of Representatives, 1937–1940
 Members of the Australian House of Representatives, 1940–1943
 Members of the Australian Senate, 1941–1944
 Members of the Australian Senate, 1938–1941
 List of political parties in Australia

References
Adam Carr's Election Archive - House of Representatives 1940
Adam Carr's Election Archive - Senate 1940

1940 in Australia
Candidates for Australian federal elections